Leslie Pearl is an American pop singer-songwriter born in Pennsylvania on July 26, 1952. She wrote hits for Crystal Gayle, Kenny Rogers, Johnny Mathis and Dr. Hook, as well as writing the lyrics and music for the Karen Carpenter song "My Body Keeps Changing My Mind".

In 1977, Pearl recorded her first album, Pearl, with her sister Deborah Pearl, on London Records. In 1982, she recorded a second album, Words & Music, this time for RCA Records. It yielded the Top 40 hit "If the Love Fits Wear It", which spent 16 weeks on the Billboard Hot 100, peaking at number 28 in August 1982. It also peaked at number 7 on the Adult Contemporary chart and at number 25 on the Cashbox music chart. The song also charted on the Canadian Adult Contemporary chart, reaching number 16, and in Ireland, where it peaked at number 23.

Pearl also wrote a hit for Dr. Hook ("Girls Can Get It") and one for Crystal Gayle ("You Never Gave Up on Me").  She wrote and sang jingles for Pepsi, Folgers Coffee, Ford, Gillette and others. Composed in 1984, Pearl's Folgers coffee jingle was transformed into country, gospel, jazz, R&B, folk, Celtic and a cappella versions, and Folgers runs an annual contest to find the best new interpretation.

Discography
 Pearl (1977)
 Words & Music (1982)

References

External links
 
 

American pop musicians
Singers from Pennsylvania
Living people
Year of birth missing (living people)